Pop is a nickname of:

 Tihomir Asanović (born 1948), Croatian jazz-rock and fusion keyboardist, Hammond organ player and composer
 Pop Corkhill (1858–1921), American baseball player
 Pop Dillon (1873–1931), American baseball player
 Pop Foster (1878–1944), American baseball player
 Pop Gates (1917–1999), American basketball player and coach
 Pop Golden (1868–1949), American football and baseball coach
 Pop Goodwin (1920–2005), American basketball player
 Pop Hart (1868–1933), American painter and watercolorist
 Pop Hollinger (1886–1977), American comic book collector
 Pop Ivy (1916–2003), American football player and coach
 Pop Joy (1860–1937), American baseball player
 Pop Laval (1882–1966), American photographer
 Pop Levi (born 1977), English singer, musician, record producer and filmmaker
 Fred T. Long (1896–1966), American Negro league baseball player and college football coach
 Ed Lytle (1862–1950), American baseball player and manager
 Pop McKale (1887–1967), American football and baseball player, coach of football, basketball, baseball, and track, and college athletics administrator
Pop Momand (1887–1987), American cartoonist
 Gregg Popovich (born 1949), American basketball coach
 Pop Robson (born 1945), English footballer
 Pop Schriver (1865–1932), American baseball catcher
 Pop Smith (1856–1927), Canadian baseball player
 Pop Snyder (1854–1924), American baseball player, manager and umpire
 Pop Tate (baseball) (1860–1932), American baseball catcher
 Pop Warner (1871–1954), American football player and coach
 Pop Williams (1874–1959), American baseball pitcher
 Pop Williams (American football) (1906–1979), American football player

See also
 Pops (nickname)
 Dad (nickname)
 Daddy (nickname)
 Papa (nickname)
 Pappy

Lists of people by nickname